Cita or CITA may refer to:

 Cita, Texas
 Cita Morei, women's liberation and anti-nuclear weapons activist and writer
 MV Cita, a German merchant ship
 La Cita (album), a 1994 album by Mexican pop singer Daniela Romo.

Acronyms
 Canadian Institute for Theoretical Astrophysics
 Cash in the Attic, a UK television show about antiques
 Caught in the Act (disambiguation) (various groups and media)
 Citizens Advice, the trading name of the National Association of Citizens Advice Bureaux, sometimes referred to as CitA although this usage is now deprecated
 Commission on International and Trans-Regional Accreditation, an educational accrediting agency
 CITA-FM in Moncton, New Brunswick
 Christ is the Answer, a Jesus movement 
 CITA International School, in Port Harcourt, Nigeria

See also
 Cita's World